Ihor Bohdanovych Semenyna (born 1 January 1989) is a Ukrainian professional football midfielder who plays for Holešov.

Career
Semenyna is a product of the Youth Sportive School Ternopil and spent time playing for different Ukrainian teams. His first trainers were Bohdan Buchynskyi and Andriy Yablonskyi. In 2013, he signed a contract with FC Olimpik Donetsk.

References

External links

1989 births
Living people
Sportspeople from Ternopil
Ukrainian footballers
Association football midfielders
FC Nyva Ternopil players
FC Feniks-Illichovets Kalinine players
FC Naftovyk-Ukrnafta Okhtyrka players
FC Lviv players
FC Enerhetyk Burshtyn players
MFC Mykolaiv players
FC Olimpik Donetsk players
FC Cherkashchyna players
FC Helios Kharkiv players
FC Krystal Kherson players
FC Karpaty Lviv players
Ukrainian Premier League players
Ukrainian First League players
Ukrainian Second League players
Ukrainian expatriate footballers
Expatriate footballers in the Czech Republic
Ukrainian expatriate sportspeople in the Czech Republic